White's Directories were a series of directory publications issued by William White of Sheffield, England, beginning in the 1820s. White began his career in publishing by working for Edward Baines.

Notes

References

Further reading

1820s–1830s 
 
 
 
 1845 ed.
 1864 ed.

1840s 
 
 1874 ed.

1870s

External links
 . Includes digitised White's directories, various dates
 

Directories
Publications established in the 1820s